Jerzy Otfinowski (25 September 1907 – 4 October 2000) was a Polish footballer. He played in one match for the Poland national football team in 1932.

References

External links
 

1907 births
2000 deaths
Polish footballers
Poland international footballers
Place of birth missing
Association footballers not categorized by position